Cinzia may refer to:

Cinzia De Carolis (born 1960), Italian actress and voice actress
Cinzia Casiraghi, Professor in Nanoscience, University of Manchester, UK and National Graphene Institute in the UK
Cinzia Cavazzuti (born 1973), Italian former judoka who competed in the 2000 and 2004 Summer Olympics
Cinzia Frosio, Italian former competitive figure skater
Cinzia Giorgio (born 1975), Italian writer
Cinzia Leone (born 1959), Italian actress and comedian
Cinzia Massironi (born 1966), Italian voice actress and actress
Cinzia Monreale (born 1957), Italian actress
Cinzia Pellin (born 1973), Italian artist
Cinzia Perona (born 1973), retired Italian female volleyball player
Cinzia Petrucci (born 1955), retired shot putter from Italy
Cinzia De Ponti (born 1960), Italian actress, model, TV personality and Miss Italia 1979
Cinzia Ragusa (born 1977), Italian water polo player and 2004 Summer Olympics gold medallist
Cinzia Sasso (born 1956), Italian journalist and writer
Cinzia Savi Scarponi (born 1963), Italian former swimmer who competed in the 1980 Summer Olympics
Cinzia Tani (born 1958), Italian writer, television presenter and radio host
Cinzia Verde, Italian researcher in marine biochemistry at the National Research Council (CNR)
Cinzia Zehnder (born 1997), Swiss professional footballer